Doğancık is a village in the Sultandağı District, Afyonkarahisar Province, Turkey. Its population is 197 (2021).

References

Villages in Sultandağı District